Tsong or Nsong (ISO "Songo") is a Bantu language of the Democratic Republic of the Congo. It was once misclassified as a dialect of Yansi.

References

See also
Yansi language

Boma-Dzing languages
Languages of the Democratic Republic of the Congo